Bannside was a single-member county constituency of the Parliament of Northern Ireland.

Boundaries and Boundary Changes
This was a division of County Antrim. Before 1929 it was part of the seven-member Antrim constituency. The constituency sent one MP to the House of Commons of Northern Ireland from 1929 until the Parliament was temporarily suspended in 1972, and then formally abolished in 1973.

In terms of the then local government areas the constituency in 1929 comprised parts of the Rural Districts of Antrim, Ballymena and Ballymoney.

After boundary changes in 1969 the constituency included parts of the same Rural Districts but Bannside was extended to take in the northern part of the 1929–1969 Antrim Borough constituency.

Members of Parliament

Elections

The parliamentary representatives of the division were elected using the first past the post system.

 Death of Young

 Death of Patrick

 Boundary changes

 Resignation of O'Neill

 Parliament prorogued 30 March 1972 and abolished 18 July 1973

Peerage title
When Ian Paisley was created a life peer in 2010, the took his title of Baron Bannside, of North Antrim in the County of Antrim from the constituency he had won in 1970.

References
 Northern Ireland Parliamentary Election Results 1921–1972, compiled and edited by Sydney Elliott (Political Reference Publications 1973)

External links
 For the exact definition of Northern Ireland constituency boundaries see http://www.election.demon.co.uk/stormont/boundaries.html 

Northern Ireland Parliament constituencies established in 1929
Constituencies of the Northern Ireland Parliament
Historic constituencies in County Antrim
Northern Ireland Parliament constituencies disestablished in 1973
1929 establishments in Northern Ireland